Kerrod is a given name and a surname. 

Notable people with the given name include:
Kerrod Hall (born 1990), Australian international touch football referee
Kerrod Holland (born 1992), Australian professional rugby league footballer
Kerrod McGregor (born 1962), Australian Paralympic athlete
Kerrod Walters (born 1967), Australian former rugby league footballer

Notable people with the surname include:
Simon Kerrod (born 1992), South African rugby union player